The Rivers Trust (RT) is an environmental charity No. 1107144, and an umbrella organisation for 60 member trusts concerned with rivers in England, Wales, Northern Ireland and Ireland. The Trust's headquarters are in Callington, Cornwall. The Rivers Trust along with its members work to protect, promote and enhance freshwater ecosystems for both people and wildlife.

The Rivers Trust was founded in 2001 as the  Association of Rivers Trusts. Its founding associations were four River Trusts: the Eden Rivers Trust, Tweed Foundation, Westcountry Rivers Trust, and the Wye and Usk Foundation. The association was granted registered charity status in 2004. Its Scottish equivalent is the Rivers and Fisheries Trusts of Scotland (RAFTS). Its Welsh equivalent is Afonydd Cymru: The Rivers Trust of Wales. (AC)

The association changed its name in August 2011 to The Rivers Trust.

The Rivers Trust are members of Blueprint for Water , Wildlife and Countryside Link  and are administrators of the Catchment Based Approach .

Member organisations

 Action for the River Kennet
 Aire Rivers Trust
 Arun and Rother Rivers Trust
 Ballinderry Rivers Trust
 Blackwater Rivers Trust
 Bristol Avon Rivers Trust
 Calder Rivers Trust
 Cambridgeshire Rivers Trust
 Clwyd, Conwy and Gwynedd Rivers Trust
 Cotswold Rivers Trust
 Don Catchment Rivers Trust
 East Yorkshire Rivers Trust
 Eden Rivers Trust
 Erne Rivers Trust
 Essex and Suffolk Rivers Trust
 Galloway Fisheries Trust
 Galway Waterways Foundation
 Inishowen Rivers Trust
 Lagan Rivers Trust
 Lincolnshire Rivers Trust
 Lune Rivers Trust
 Maigue Rivers Trust
 Main Rivers Trust
 Mersey Rivers Trust
 Moy Catchment River Association
 Norfolk Rivers Trust
 Northumberland Rivers Trust
 Nore Rivers Trust
 Ouse and Adur Rivers Trust
 Ribble Rivers Trust
 River Nene Regional Park CiC
 River Waveney Trust
 Severn Rivers Trust
 Six Mile Rivers Trust
 Slaney River Trust
 South Cumbria Rivers Trust
 South East Rivers Trust
 South East Wales Rivers Trust
 Strule Tributaries Rivers Trust
 Tees Rivers Trust
 Thames Rivers Trust	
 Thames 21
 Trent Rivers Trust
 Tweed Forum Limited
 Tyne Rivers Trust
 Waterville Lakes and Rivers Trust
 Wear Rivers Trust
 Welland Rivers Trust
 Welsh Dee Rivers Trust
 Wessex Chalk Stream and Rivers Trust
 West Cumbria Rivers Trust 
 West Wales Rivers Trust
 Westcountry Rivers Trust
 Wye and Usk Foundation
 Wyre Rivers Trust
 Yorkshire Dales Rivers Trust
 Yorkshire Esk Rivers Trust

See also
List of waterway societies in the United Kingdom
List of navigation authorities in the United Kingdom
Rivers and Fisheries Trusts of Scotland

References

External links
Official website

Organisations based in Cornwall
Rivers of England
Rivers of Wales
Waterways organisations in the United Kingdom
Callington